The 1030s was a decade of the Julian Calendar which began on January 1, 1030, and ended on December 31, 1039.

Significant people
 Al-Qadir caliph of Baghdad
 Abu Ja'far al-Qa'im caliph of Baghdad
 Al-Zahir li-i'zaz Din Allah caliph of Cairo
 Godwin, Earl of Wessex

References